Polden may refer to:

Chilton Polden, rural village and civil parish near Edington, north of the Polden Hills in the Sedgemoor district of Somerset, England
East Polden Grasslands, Site of Special Scientific Interest on the Polden Hills in Somerset
Gale & Polden, British printer and publisher
Polden Hills, long, low ridge, extending for 20 miles, parallel to the Mendip Hills in Somerset, England